is a district located in Nagano Prefecture, Japan.

As of 2011, the district has an estimated population of 23,774. As a result of mergers the total area of the district is now 282.65 km2.

Towns and villages 
Iizuna
Shinano
Ogawa

Mergers 
 On January 1, 2005 the town of Toyono and the villages of Togakushi and Kinasa merged into the city of Nagano.
 On October 1, 2005 the villages of Mure and Samizu merged to form the new town of Iizuna.
 On January 1, 2010 the town of Shinshūshinmachi and the village of Nakajō merged into the city of Nagano.

References

Districts in Nagano Prefecture